This article is a list of diseases of Persian violets (Exacum affine).

Fungal diseases

Nematode diseases

Viral and viroid diseases

References
Common Names of Diseases, The American Phytopathological Society

Persian violet